Special Beat Service is the third studio album by British ska band the Beat, released on 1 October 1982 by Go-Feet Records. Like the rest of their material, it was released in the US under the name "the English Beat". It peaked at No. 39 on the Billboard 200 album chart in 1983 on the strength of two singles, "I Confess" and "Save It for Later," the music videos for which received modest airplay on the fledgling MTV video network.

Critical reception

The Spin Alternative Record Guide wrote that "'Save It for Later' and 'End of the Party' are romantic, piano-driven pop gems." Rolling Stone said that "'Special Beat Service' sparkles with surprising touches"

Track listing

Personnel
Credits are adapted from the Special Beat Service liner notes.

The Beat
 Ranking Roger – toasting; vocals; percussion
 Dave Wakeling – vocals; guitar
 David Steele – bass; banjo
 Andy Cox – guitar; mandolin
 Everett Morton – drums
 Saxa – saxophone
 Wesley Magoogan – clarinet; lyricon; saxophone; sax FX unit
 Dave "Blockhead" Wright – keyboards; piano

Additional musicians
 Bob Sargeant – telephone; marimba
 Marc Fox – percussion
 Jack Emblow – accordion
 Markandey Mishra – tabla
 Vince Sullivan – trombone
 Dave Lord – trumpet
 Steve Sidwell – trumpet
 Pato Banton – toasting

Production and artwork
 Bob Sargeant – producer
 Trevor Hallesy – engineer
 Mark Dearnley – engineer
 Brian Gaylor – engineer
 Ian Cooper – cutting engineer
 Mike Hedges – producer ("Pato and Roger a Go Talk")
 Ranking Roger – producer ("Pato and Roger a Go Talk")
 Martyn Atkins – art direction
 Nick Rogers – supervisor

Charts

References

External links
 

The Beat (British band) albums
1982 albums
I.R.S. Records albums
Albums produced by Bob Sargeant